The 2013–14 season was Blackpool's third-consecutive season in the Football League Championship, the second tier of English professional football, and their 105th overall season in the Football League.

Season summary

Blackpool also competed in the League Cup, going out in the first round, and the FA Cup, exiting in the third round.

The season was to be Paul Ince's first full season as manager, but on 21 January 2014 he was sacked from the role; a full-time replacement was not named. Barry Ferguson was installed as caretaker manager on 21 January and remained in the role until the end of the season.

Pre-season

Incoming transfers during the pre-season period included Scottish central defender and later captain Gary MacKenzie, who signed from MK Dons on the eve of their opening friendly for an undisclosed fee. Striker Bobby Grant joined from Rochdale, also for a fee that was not publicly stated. An unattached Michael Chopra and fellow striker Steven Davies (£500,000 from Bristol City) also joined the ranks. On 1 August, Jack Robinson joined on a season-long loan from Liverpool. The following day, the eve of the season proper kick-off, Neal Bishop signed from Notts County on a five-month contract.

Outbound, on free transfers, went Ashley Eastham (Rochdale), Stephen Crainey (Wigan Athletic), Alex Baptiste (Bolton Wanderers), Kevin Phillips (to Ian Holloway's Crystal Palace), Neal Eardley (Birmingham City) and Tiago Gomes (released).

The World Group Stadium, home of Penrith, was the venue for Blackpool's opening pre-season friendly on 6 July. Matt Phillips and Tom Ince were the scorers for the visitors as they ran out 2–0 winners.

A week later, they made the short trip up the Fylde Coast to take on Morecambe at the Globe Arena. Tom Ince was again on the score sheet in a 1–1 draw.

On 16 July, The Seasiders lost to a Kendal Town XI. Trialist Caleb Folan netted for Blackpool.

Two days later, Blackpool travelled to Witton Albion and won 3–0. Tom Ince, Tom Barkhuizen and Craig Cathcart were the scorers.

On 20 July, Blackpool crossed the Pennines to face York City. The hosts went ahead on 55 minutes, but Bobby Grant levelled matters a minute later in what was the final goal of the game.

Three days later, Blackpool visited Bury and again came away with a 1–1 draw. Kirk Broadfoot was the scorer for the Tangerines.

Pre-season was closed out with the a first fixture at Bloomfield Road. Premier League outfit Newcastle United were the visitors, and the Magpies returned to the North East with a 1–0 victory under their belt.

In their seven pre-season fixtures, Blackpool won two, drew three and lost two.

Season proper
Blackpool's opening fixture, on 3 August, was at Doncaster Rovers. The visitors won 3–1, with goals from Steven Davies, Gary MacKenzie and Tom Ince.

Two days later, Blackpool exited the League Cup at the hands of arch-rivals Preston North End.

Barnsley were the visitors to Bloomfield Road on 10 August. A single goal, put into his own net by Scott Golbourne (wrongly credited as Scott Wiseman), gave the hosts all three points.

An unattached Ricardo Fuller joined Blackpool on a free transfer on 15 August, and the following day, Nathan Delfouneso, a loanee at the club last season, returned on a six-month loan.

On 17 August, Blackpool travelled to Middlesbrough, with whom they fought out a 1–1 draw. Chris Basham scored the goal for Paul Ince's men.

A week later, Blackpool hosted Reading. A Tom Barkhuizen goal, his first in professional football, gave the Seasiders all three points and put them top of the table, on goal difference, ahead of Leicester City and Q.P.R.

Young right back Charles Dunne joined Blackpool from Wycombe Wanderers for an undisclosed fee on 23 August, the same day that  Matt Phillips left for pastures new at Q.P.R.

On 31 August, Watford visited the seaside. Tom Ince netted the only goal of the game to give Blackpool the victory.

Bradley Orr joined the squad on a five-month loan deal from Blackburn Rovers on 2 September. The same day, forward Nathan Tyson signed on a free transfer from Derby County.

After a two-week international break, Blackpool made it five wins from their opening six League games — their best-ever start to a campaign — with a 2–1 victory at Bournemouth, despite having Jack Robinson dismissed. Ricardo Fuller and Neal Bishop got the goals. Blackpool remained top of the table, ahead of Harry Redknapp's Q.P.R., on goal difference. After an altercation in the Dean Court tunnel with an official, Paul Ince was given a five-match stadium ban and was fined £4,000.

On 17 September, Blackpool suffered their first defeat of the League campaign. It came at Millwall. Tom Ince scored the visitors’ goal. The three goals they conceded saw them slip to third place in the table.

Four days later, Blackpool hosted Leicester City. Chris Basham and Tom Ince scored for the Tangerines in a 2–2 draw.

Huddersfield Town was the destination on 27 September. Ricard Fuller scored his second goal of the campaign in a 1–1 draw. Ángel was sent off for Blackpool.

October was rung in with a goalless draw at home to Bolton Wanderers, followed by the same result at Charlton Athletic on 5 October.

On the eve of the Charlton game, Dan Gosling joined on loan from Newcastle United.

After another international break, Blackpool mustered their first victory in five games when a Tom Ince penalty was enough to see off Wigan Athletic on 19 October.

Blackburn Rovers visited Bloomfield Road for a Lancashire derby on 26 October. Another Tom Ince penalty, coupled with a first goal for the club by Dan Gosling, helped Blackpool to a 2–2 draw. Jack Robinson was sent off for the second time this season.

On 2 November, Blackpool visited Nottingham Forest. Proving that they are Forest manager Billy Davies’ bogey team, Blackpool returned home with all three points thanks to Stephen Dobbie's last-minute strike. Dobbie had joined Blackpool on loan for the fourth time on 18 September, this time from Crystal Palace.

Seven days later, Blackpool suffered their second defeat of the campaign, 2–3 at home to Ipswich Town. Stephen Dobbie scored Blackpool's first goal. Steven Davies scored what was an equaliser to make it 2–2 in injury time, but Ipswich still found time to edge ahead again to win the game.

After a fortnight break, Blackpool travelled to Birmingham City on 23 November. Ricard Fuller scored the second goal of a game that finished 1–1.

A week later, Blackpool beat Sheffield Wednesday 2–0 at Bloomfield Road, with goals from Ricardo Fuller and Dan Gosling. It was, however, from this point on that Blackpool's long descent down the table began. Indeed, they would not see another victory for seventeen League games (or 1,530 minutes).

Blackpool travelled to Yeovil Town on 3 December and lost to a solitary goal, despite having three players (Ricardo Fuller, Kirk Broadfoot and Gary MacKenzie) sent off.

Four days later, they were thrashed 5–1 at Derby County, despite taking a third-minute lead through Isaiah Osbourne. Blackpool had Neal Bishop and Ángel sent off, meaning five players had been dismissed in two games.

On 14 December, Q.P.R. left Bloomfield Road with all through points after a 2–0 victory.

The following weekend, Lancashire rivals Burnley beat Blackpool 2–1 at Turf Moor. Craig Cathcart scored for the visitors.

A point was gained in a Boxing Day draw at Leeds United. Tom Ince, with his first goal since the end of October, scored for Blackpool. It was his seventh and final goal before a loan move to Crystal Palace in January. Kirk Broadfoot was sent off for the second time in a month.

On 29 December, a battle-of-the-seasides was won by Brighton.

2014 was seen in with a 2–0 defeat at Sheffield Wednesday.

Blackpool exited their second cup competition at the first hurdle on 4 January. This time it was the FA Cup, and Bolton Wanderers were the ones who progressed to the fourth round.

On 11 January, Middlesbrough visited Bloomfield Road and took all three points.

The following Friday saw David Perkins' arrival on loan from Barnsley. He could not face his parent club the next day, when Blackpool returned with a defeat, their fourth-successive. It was after this game, on 21 January, that Paul Ince, Steve Thompson and Alex Rae were relieved of their duties. Club captain Barry Ferguson was installed as caretaker player-manager, and although he initially stated that he would not be taking to the field during his tenure in the role, he pulled on his boots for two games towards the end of the campaign.

Ferguson quickly brought in a few new faces on loan to try to change Blackpool's fortunes. David Goodwillie came in from Blackburn Rovers; Andy Halliday from Middlesbrough; Andy Keogh from Millwall; and Tony McMahon from Sheffield United.

A point was gained on 25 January with Doncaster Rovers’ visit. Andy Halliday scored Blackpool's goal, their first in those four games.

A 5–1 defeat at Reading followed on 28 January. Steven Davies scored for the visitors.

On 31 January, Belgian midfielder Faris Haroun became Barry Ferguson's fifth new face.

The first day of February saw another loss, this time at Blackburn Rovers.

Elliot Grandin returned to Blackpool on a free transfer after being released by Crystal Palace. Also coming in was Kevin Foley, on loan from Wolves. Bob Harris, meanwhile, joined Sheffield United on a permanent basis, having been on loan to the Blades.

The ship was steadied on 8 February with a point at home to Nottingham Forest. Andy Keogh, on loan from Ian Holloway's new club, Millwall, scored late in the game to give Blackpool a share of the points.

Another draw, this time goalless, followed after a visit to Ipswich Town.

A run of three consecutive defeats began on 22 February with Birmingham's visit to Bloomfield Road. Andy Keogh scored his second goal for the club in the 1–2 scoreline. Jack Robinson saw red for the third time this season. It was Blackpool's tenth dismissal of the campaign.

Watford were 4–0 victors at Vicarage Road on 1 March.

Bournemouth exacted revenge for their defeat at Dean Court in September with a single-goal victory at Bloomfield Road on 8 March.

Three days later, Barry Ferguson picked up his first win in charge — and Blackpool's first in eighteen games in all competitions — with a victory over Ian Holloway's Millwall. Ricardo Fuller scored the only goal of the game.

On 15 March, Blackpool visited table-topping Leicester City. Despite taking the lead through loanee David Goodwillie, the Seasiders went on to lose 3–1.

Robert Earnshaw joined Blackpool on a free transfer on 21 March.

The following day, Blackpool made it six points out of nine with a single-goal victory over Huddersfield Town. Ricardo Fuller scored the goal, his sixth of the season, which put him one behind leading scorer Tom Ince. Blackpool now sat in 18th position, nine points clear of the relegation zone with nine games remaining.

On 25 March, Blackpool lost by a single goal to Bolton Wanderers at the Reebok Stadium.

Three days later, Greek striker Apostolos Vellios became Barry Ferguson's ninth signing when he joined on loan from Everton until the end of the season. Out on loan, meanwhile, went James Caton (Chester), Nathan Eccleston (Coventry City) and Anderson Banvo (Stevenage).

Blackpool earned a 1–1 draw at Q.P.R. on 29 March. David Goodwillie scored his second goal in four games for the Seasiders, who slipped one place to 19th. Barnsley were victorious at Yeovil, which reduced the gap between Blackpool and the relegation places to seven points.

They lost 2–1 at home to bottom-of-the-table Yeovil Town on 5 April, a result that saw them fall one place to 20th, six points clear of the relegation zone.

Three further defeats followed — at home to Derby on 8 April (which left them three points above Millwall and the drop zone) and at Leeds United on 12 April. Millwall drew on the latter match day, narrowing the gap between them to two points. Blackpool had now lost twenty league games in a season for the first time since 1999–2000. The fourth consecutive defeat occurred against Burnley at Bloomfield Road on 18 April. Millwall played Middlesbrough the following day, winning 2–1, a result that put Blackpool into the relegation zone for the first time.

A draw was obtained at Brighton on 21 April, but Blackpool remained in the bottom three.

A victory, at Wigan Athletic on 26 April, lifted Blackpool up to 18th. It was their first away victory since 2 November, and the first time they had scored twice in a game since 30 November. Birmingham City took their place in the relegation zone. Blackpool sat three points clear of the Blues but had played one game more.

The season was rounded out with a 3–0 home defeat by Charlton Athletic. Results elsewhere went in Blackpool's favour, however, and they finished in 20th position, two points clear of Doncaster, who were relegated.

Eight players either returned to their parent club or returned to the free-agent market upon the season's completion: Jack Robinson, Neal Bishop, Andy Halliday, Faris Haroun, Andy Keogh, David Goodwillie, Stephen Dobbie and Robert Earnshaw.

Statistics

Appearances and goals

|}

Players used: 38
Goals scored: 39 (38 League; 1 FA Cup)

Disciplinary record

Results

Pre-season friendlies

Championship

League table

League Cup

FA Cup

Transfers

In

Out

Notes
 Entered competition in third round

References

Blackpool F.C. seasons
Blackpool